Labellum (plural: labella) is the Latin diminutive of labium, meaning lip. These are anatomical terms used descriptively in biology:

 Labellum (botany), a part of a flower
 Labellum (insect anatomy), a part of the mouth of an insect

See also 
 La Bella, portrait of an unidentified woman by Titian